The 2021 Hun Sen Cup is the 15th season of the Hun Sen Cup, the premier football knockout tournament in Cambodia, for association football clubs in Cambodia involving Cambodian League and provincial teams organized by the Football Federation of Cambodia. Visakha won the cup after beating Nagaworld 2-0 in the 2020 final. It was Visakha's first time winning the cup. The competition is split into 2 stages, provincial stage and national stage. The top three teams from provincial stage will enter the national stage with the 13 teams in Cambodian League 2021.

Provincial stage

Provincial group stage

Provincial stage quarter-finals

Provincial stage semi-finals

Note: Due to positive cases of Covid-19 for two players of Battambang FC before Octerber 18, and two more players of Battambang FC before the match started, Cambodian National Competitions Committee (CNCC) cancel the match and the winning result will be given to Tboung Khumum FC.

Provincial stage finals

Provincial stage awards

Top goal scorer : Tha Kriya of Battambang FC (10 goals)
Best coach : Hok Sochivorn of Koh Kong FC
Best goalkeeper : Kendeth Sotheavathana of Koh Kong FC

National stage

Round of 16

Quarter-finals

Semi-finals

Third place play-off

Final

Awards

Top goal scorer : Keo Sokpheng of Visakha (7 goals)
Best goalkeeper : Keo Soksela of Visakha
Best player : Ouk Sovann of Visakha
Best coach : Akeeb Tunji Ayoyinka of Visakha
Fair play : Phnom Penh Crown

See also
2021 C-League

References

Hun Sen Cup seasons
C-League seasons
2021 in Cambodian football
Cambodia